The 2021 Iowa Hawkeyes baseball team was a baseball team that represented the University of Iowa in the 2021 NCAA Division I baseball season. The Hawkeyes were members of the Big Ten Conference and played their home games at Duane Banks Field in Iowa City, Iowa. They were led by eighth-year head coach Rick Heller.

Previous season
The Hawkeyes finished the 2020 NCAA Division I baseball season 10–5 overall (0–0 conference) and first place in conference standings, as the season was cut short in stages by March 12 due to the COVID-19 pandemic.

Preseason
For the 2021 Big Ten Conference poll, Iowa was voted to finish in fourth by the Big Ten Coaches.

Roster

Schedule

! style="" | Regular Season
|- valign="top" 

|- bgcolor="#ffcccc"
| 1 || March 6 || vs Michigan || Dell Diamond • Round Rock, Texas || 2–4 || Weiss (1–0) || Beutel (0–1) || None || – || 0–1 || 0–1
|- bgcolor="#ccffcc"
| 2 || March 7 || vs Michigan || Dell Diamond • Round Rock, Texas || 8–3 || Nedved (1–0) || Weston (0–1) || None || 150 || 1–1 || 1–1
|- bgcolor="#ffcccc"
| 3 || March 7 || vs Michigan || Dell Diamond • Round Rock, Texas || 0–7 || Denner (1–0) || Baumann (0–1) || None || 150 || 1–2 || 1–2
|- bgcolor="#ffcccc"
| 4 || March 8 || vs Michigan || Dell Diamond • Round Rock, Texas || 4–11 || Dragani (1–0) || Lee (0–1) || None || 150 || 1–3 || 1–3
|- bgcolor="#ccffcc"
| 5 || March 12 || vs Ohio State || U.S. Bank Stadium • Minneapolis, Minnesota || 4–0 || Wallace (1–0) || Lonsway (0–1) || Nedved (2) || 250 || 2–3 || 2–3
|- bgcolor="#ffcccc"
| 6 || March 13 || vs Nebraska || U.S. Bank Stadium • Minneapolis, Minnesota || 0–4 || Hrock (2–0) || Irvine (0–1) || Schwellenbach (1) || 250 || 2–4 || 2–4
|- bgcolor="#ffcccc"
| 7 || March 13 || vs Ohio State || U.S. Bank Stadium • Minneapolis, Minnesota || 4–7 || Murphy (1–0) || Baumann (0–2) || Brock (1) || 50 || 2–5 || 2–5
|- bgcolor="#ccffcc"
| 8 || March 14 || vs Nebraska || U.S. Bank Stadium • Minneapolis, Minnesota || 3–1 || Davitt (1–0) || Bunz (0–1) || Nedved (2) || 250 || 3–5 || 3–5
|- bgcolor="#ccffcc"
| 9 || March 19 || Nebraska || Duane Banks Field • Iowa City, Iowa || 3–0 || Wallace (2–0) || Povich (1–1) || Hoffman (1) || 309 || 4–5 || 4–5
|- bgcolor="#ffcccc"
| 10 || March 20 || Nebraska || Duane Banks Field • Iowa City, Iowa || 8–10 || Bragg (1–1) || Irvine (0–2) || Schwellenbach (2) || 350 || 4–6 || 4–6
|- bgcolor="#ffcccc"
| 11 || March 21 || Nebraska || Duane Banks Field • Iowa City, Iowa || 8–13 || Martin (1–0) || Davitt (1–1) || None || 329 || 4–7 || 4–7
|- bgcolor="#ffcccc"
| 12 || March 26 || at Ohio State || Bill Davis Stadium • Columbus, Ohio || 2–8 || Burhenn (1–1) || Wallace (2–1) || None || 205 || 4–8 || 4–8
|- bgcolor="#ccffcc"
| 13 || March 27 || at Ohio State || Bill Davis Stadium • Columbus, Ohio || 5–1 || Baumann (2–1) || Lonsway (0–3) || Nedved (3) || – || 5–8 || 5–8
|- bgcolor="#ccffcc"
| 14 || March 27 || Maryland || Bill Davis Stadium • Columbus, Ohio || 6–4 || Hoffman (1–0) || Ramsey (0–1) || Nedved (4) || – || 6–8 || 6–8
|- bgcolor="#ccffcc"
| 15 || March 28 || Maryland || Bill Davis Stadium • Columbus, Ohio || 11–2 || Davitt (2–1) || Staine (0–2) || None || – || 7–8 || 7–8
|-

|- bgcolor="#ccffcc"
| 16 || April 2 || at Purdue || Alexander Field • West Lafayette, Indiana || 4–2 || Nedved (2–0) || Weins (0–1) || None || 479 || 8–8 || 8–8
|- bgcolor="#ffcccc"
| 17 || April 3 || at Purdue || Alexander Field • West Lafayette, Indiana || 8–10 || Brooks (1–1) || Guzek (0–1) || Cook (1) || 496 || 8–9 || 8–9
|- bgcolor="#ccffcc"
| 18 || April 4 || at Purdue || Alexander Field • West Lafayette, Indiana || 8–5 || Davitt (3–1) || Kulak (0–1) || None || 534 || 9–9 || 9–9
|- bgcolor="#ccffcc"
| 19 || April 9 ||  || Duane Banks Field • Iowa City, Iowa || 7–1 || Wallace (3–1) || Ireland (0–3) || None || 639 || 10–9 || 10–9
|- bgcolor="#ccffcc"
| 20 || April 11 || Minnesota || Duane Banks Field • Iowa City, Iowa || 6–1 || Irvine (1–2) || Liffrig (1–2) || Nedved (5) || 985 || 11–9 || 11–9
|- bgcolor="#ccffcc"
| 21 || April 11 || Minnesota || Duane Banks Field • Iowa City, Iowa || 18–0 || Baumann (2–2) || Schoeberl (0–2) || None || 985 || 12–9 || 12–9
|- bgcolor="#ccffcc"
| 22 || April 16 || at  || Bainton Field • Piscataway, New Jersey || 14–12 || Hoffman (2–0) || Muller (1–1) || None || 200 || 13–9 || 13–9
|- bgcolor="#ccffcc"
| 23 || April 17 || at Rutgers || Bainton Field • Piscataway, New Jersey || 3–1 || Irvine (2–2) || Wereski (4–2) || None || 200 || 14–9 || 14–9
|- bgcolor="#ccffcc"
| 24 || April 17 || at Rutgers || Bainton Field • Piscataway, New Jersey || 8–1 || Baumann (3–2) || Fitzpatrick (2–2) || None || 200 || 15–9 || 15–9
|- bgcolor="#ffcccc"
| 25 || April 18 || at Rutgers || Bainton Field • Piscataway, New Jersey || 7–8 || Reardon (1–0) || Leonard (0–1) || None || 200 || 15–10 || 15–10
|- bgcolor="#ccffcc"
| 26 || April 23 || Maryland || Duane Banks Field • Iowa City, Iowa || 6–2 || Hoffman (3–0) || Burke (2–3) || Nedved (6) || 528 || 16–10 || 16–10
|- bgcolor="#ffcccc"
| 27 || April 24 || Maryland || Duane Banks Field • Iowa City, Iowa || 6–8 || Dean (1–0) || Irvine (2–3) || Bello (5) || 1,112 || 16–11 || 16–11
|- bgcolor="#ccffcc"
| 28 || April 25 || Northwestern || Duane Banks Field • Iowa City, Iowa || 15–4 || Baumann (4–2) || Lavelle (4–2) || None || 657 || 17–11 || 17–11
|- bgcolor="#ccffcc"
| 29 || April 26 || Northwestern || Duane Banks Field • Iowa City, Iowa || 12–9 || Nedved (3–0) || Smith (1–3) || None || 544 || 18–11 || 18–11
|- bgcolor="#ccffcc"
| 30 || April 30 || at Indiana || Bart Kaufman Field • Bloomington, Indiana || 6–5 || Wallace (4–1) || Sommer (5–2) || Nedved (7) || 150 || 19–11 || 19–11
|-

|- bgcolor="#ffcccc"
| 31 || May 1 || at Indiana || Bart Kaufman Field • Bloomington, Indiana || 6–12 || Modugno (2–1) || Irvine (2–4) || Bothwell (1) || 150 || 19–12 || 19–12
|- bgcolor="#ffcccc"
| 32 || May 2 || at Indiana || Bart Kaufman Field • Bloomington, Indiana || 8–12 || Bierman (4–2) || Baumann (4–3) || None || 150 || 19–13 || 19–13
|- bgcolor="#ccffcc"
| 33 || May 7 ||  || Duane Banks Field • Iowa City, Iowa || 4–2 || Wallace (5–1) || Dees (3–3) || Nedved (8) || 691 || 20–13 || 20–13
|- bgcolor="#ccffcc"
| 34 || May 8 || Penn State || Duane Banks Field • Iowa City, Iowa || 5–3 || Davitt (4–1) || Larkin (3–6) || Leonard (1) || 0 || 21–13 || 21–13
|- bgcolor="#ffcccc"
| 35 || May 9 || Penn State || Duane Banks Field • Iowa City, Iowa || 4–5 || Virbitsky (3–3) || Baumann (4–4) || None || 986 || 21–14 || 21–14
|- bgcolor="#ccffcc"
| 36 || May 14 ||  || Duane Banks Field • Iowa City, Iowa || 5–4 || Nedved (4–0) || Kirschsieper (3–4) || None || 1,022 || 22–14 || 22–14
|- bgcolor="#ffcccc"
| 37 || May 15 || Illinois || Duane Banks Field • Iowa City, Iowa || 1–14 || Lavender (6–2) || Davitt (4–2) || Kutt (2) || 1,165 || 22–15 || 22–15
|- bgcolor="#ffcccc"
| 38 || May 16 || Illinois || Duane Banks Field • Iowa City, Iowa || 2–6 || Gowens (2–3) || Baumann (4–5) || None || 1,132 || 22–16 || 22–16
|- align="center" bgcolor="#ccffcc"
| 39 || May 21 || at Northwestern| || Rocky Miller Park • Evanston, Illinois || 6–1 || Wallace (6–1) || Doherty (1–4) || None || 165 || 23–16 || 23–16
|- align="center" bgcolor="#ffcccc"
| 40 || May 22 || at Northwestern || Rocky Miller Park • Evanston, Illinois || 4–5 || Lawerence (2–0) || Nedved (4–1) || None || 213 || 23–17 || 23–17
|- align="center" bgcolor="#ffcccc"
| 41 || May 23 || at Northwestern || Rocky Miller Park • Evanston, Illinois || 6–8 || Pate (1–0) || Irvine (2–5) || None || 185 || 23–18 || 23–18
|- align="center" bgcolor="#ccffcc"
| 42 || May 28 || at  || Drayton McLane Baseball Stadium at John H. Kobs Field • East Lansing, Michigan || 12–1 || Wallace (7–1) || Erla (5–6) || None || 314 || 24–18 || 24–18
|- align="center" bgcolor="#ccffcc"
| 43 || May 29 || at Michigan State || Drayton McLane Baseball Stadium at John H. Kobs Field • East Lansing, Michigan || 7–4 || Davitt (4–3) || Jones (2–2) || Nedved (9) || 320 || 25–18 || 25–18
|- align="center" bgcolor="#ccffcc"
| 44 || May 30 || at Michigan State || Drayton McLane Baseball Stadium at John H. Kobs Field • East Lansing, Michigan || 11–3 || Baumann (5–5) || Olson (0–1) || None || 207 || 26–18 || 26–18
|-

Awards

Big Ten Conference Players of the Week

Conference awards

2021 MLB draft

References

Iowa
Iowa Hawkeyes baseball seasons
Iowa